Kiş, Azerbaijan may refer to:
Kiş, Khojavend
Kiş, Shaki